The Caritas Don Bosco School (CDBS, Don Bosco- Caritas,（カリタス ドン・ボスコ スクール）) is a private Catholic co-education institution located in Biñan, Laguna, Philippines. It is overseen by the congregation of Suore della Carità di Gesù (SCG) Caritas Sisters of Jesus from Japan.

History 
The congregation of the Suore della Carità di Gesù (Caritas Sisters of Jesus) was founded by Italian priests belonging to the Salesians of Don Bosco in 1937 in Miyazaki, Japan. The founder, Fr. Antonio Cavoli, SDB named the congregation "Caritas" because it started with the love and concern for the poor people. The love and self-sacrificing work of the Caritas sisters for the abandoned won the hearts of many non-Catholics and led them to God, and helped spread the Caritas sisters missionary presence in 11 countries with around 500 Japanese sisters and 500 Koreans.

It was in 1992 that the first work offered to them was to set up a school in response to the growing needs of the new community in Laguna Technopark, Philippines. The Salesians of Don Bosco helped to concertize their mission by offering them the parcel of land situated at the junction of Santa Rosa and Biñan, Laguna. Since the donated land was still bare, the homeowners of Santarosa Village, a residential village within the vicinity, offered their Multi-Purpose Hall to be the temporary learning site. As a result, a co-educational school was established in 1994.

CDBS had a humble beginning consisting of 21 pre-schoolers and three Caritas sisters together with two lay teachers. Today, the CDBS family has grown with more than 1,000 in student population annually and more than a hundred faculty and staff. They now have eight buildings and several facilities including a ship-inspired chapel called the Stella Maris, a gymnasium of several courts, a multi-purpose dome, technical skills building, a soccer field, and a tent area among others.

Departments and Offerings

Grade School Department 

The Grade School Department is the largest department of the school in terms of student population. It consists of pre-school to Grade 6 pupils. The St. Joseph's Building houses the elementary classrooms. It is a three-story building designed with ramps to provide easy access from students going up and going down the floors.

Junior High School Department 

The Sacred Heart of Jesus Building houses the High School Department. It consists of two floors and ramps are also present for easy access. The following are the subject areas that form part of the high school curriculum:
 English
 Araling Panlipunan (AP)
Christian Living and Values Educations (CLVE)
Filipino
Math
Music
Drafting
TLE / Robotics
Information Technology
Music, Arts, Physical Education, Health
Integrated Science

Senior High School Department 
The Senior High School Department is housed in the latest building of the school aptly named Fr. Cavoli building whose namesake is the founder of the SCG sisters. To enhance the K-12 curriculum, it offers a selection of career-enlightening elective classes such as Robotics, Programming for Software Development, Healthcare: Introduction to Nursing, Physical Therapy, and Dentistry, AutoCad: Basic and Advanced, Local and International Film Studies, Mythology, Linguistics, and Automotive Mechanics, among others.

It currently offers the following strands from the Academic Track:
 Accounting, Business, and Management (ABM)
 Humanities and Social Sciences (HUMSS)
 Science, Technology, Engineering, and Mathematics (STEM) with a choice of being part of the Allied Health/Medicine sub-strand or the Architecture/Engineering sub-strand.

Athletics 
Caritas Don Bosco School is part of the Don Bosco Athletic Association (DBAA), wherein its other members are the different Don Bosco Schools in the Philippines. Its mascot is Grigio the Greywolf, hence, called Caritas Greywolves or Don Bosco Greywolves.

Chapel
Caritas Don Bosco School houses a boat-shaped chapel called the Stella Maris Chapel, a two-storey chapel inspired by Noah's Ark. Most of the masses are usually held here while departmental masses which happens every first Friday of the month takes place in the school gymnasium to accommodate larger number of students.

References

Schools in Laguna (province)
Schools in Biñan
Educational institutions established in 1994
Catholic elementary schools in the Philippines
Catholic secondary schools in the Philippines
1994 establishments in the Philippines